Silvana Lima is a Brazilian professional surfer. She was born in Paracuru, Ceará, Brazil on 29 October 1984 and grew up in a snack-shack on the sand, owned by her parents. When she was seven years old, she fashioned a makeshift fin to a piece of wood and taught herself to surf. She got her first real surfboard at age 14.

Despite competing in the top tier of women's surfing for eight years, Lima was unable to secure sponsorship. She spoke publicly about the challenge, attributing it to surf wear brands only wanting to sponsor surfers who look like models, regardless of their talents. In order to fund her travels, she began breeding French bulldogs.

In the ASP World Tour, she placed 9th in 2006, 3rd in 2007, runner-up in 2008 and 2009, 4th in 2010 and 5th in 2011.

She represented Brazil at the 2020 Summer Olympics. She is openly lesbian.

Career

Event Wins

WSL World Championship Tour

References

External links
Profile in World Surf League

Living people
1984 births
Brazilian surfers
World Surf League surfers
Olympic surfers of Brazil
Surfers at the 2020 Summer Olympics
Brazilian LGBT sportspeople
Sportspeople from Ceará
Female surfers
LGBT surfers